Ellipses is the plural form of two different English words:

Ellipse, a type of conic section in geometry
Ellipsis, a three-dot punctuation mark (...)

Ellipses may also refer to:
Ellipses, a French publication under the direction of Aymeric Chauprade

See also 
 Ellipse (disambiguation)
 Ellipsis (disambiguation)